Villanueva Airport  is an airport serving the town of Villanueva, in the Casanare Department of Colombia.

See also

Transport in Colombia
List of airports in Colombia

References

External links
OpenStreetMap - Villanueva
OurAirports - Villanueva

Airports in Colombia